South Dandalup Dam is a dam in Western Australia. It is located where the South Dandalup River flows out of Lake Banksiadale. The dam was built in 1971 in response to rapid population growth in Perth, Western Australia's capital city, and a resources boom in the Pilbara.

The dam was officially opened in 1974.

Western Australia's Water Corporation manages the area, and has provided facilities including picnic areas with gas barbecues, and a number of walk trails.

References

External links
 Lake Banksiadale in the Gazetteer of Australia
 

Dams completed in 1971
Dams in Western Australia
Darling Range
Shire of Murray